Kane Lafranchise (born May 27, 1988) is a Canadian former professional ice hockey defenceman.

Playing career
Lafranchise played NCAA college hockey with the Alaska Anchorage Seawolves men's ice hockey team. On February 11, 2011, the Alaska Aces of the ECHL signed Lafranchise to his first professional contract. On July 11, 2014, Lafranchise secured a one-year American Hockey League (AHL) contract with the Utica Comets.

On July 2, 2015, Lafranchise continued his career in the AHL, signing a one-year deal with the Bridgeport Sound Tigers, affiliate of the New York Islanders of the National Hockey League (NHL). In his second campaign with the Sound Tigers in 2016–17 season, he played his first full year in the AHL, setting career best marks with 5 goals, 16 assists and 21 points in 67 games.

On July 2, 2017, he was rewarded by signing his first NHL contract, in agreeing to a one-year, two-way deal with the Islanders.

On September 10, 2018, Lafranchise announced his retirement.

Personal life
Lafranchise was the winner of the 2012 The Hockey News "Name of the Year Tournament", with voters giving his name the edge over Boston Bruins' draft pick, Wacey Rabbit.

Career statistics

References

External links
 

1988 births
Living people
Abbotsford Heat players
Alaska Aces (ECHL) players
Alaska Anchorage Seawolves men's ice hockey players
Bridgeport Sound Tigers players
Canadian ice hockey defencemen
Houston Aeros (1994–2013) players
Kalamazoo Wings (ECHL) players
Missouri Mavericks players
Oklahoma City Barons players
Ice hockey people from Edmonton
Spruce Grove Saints players
Utica Comets players